Here is a list of the administrative comarcas (counties) in the autonomous community of Aragon in Spain. They were officially delimited in 1999, with substantial changes over a previously proposed division.

See also 
Comarcal council
Comarcas of Spain
See also lists of municipalities in Aragon by province:
List of municipalities in Huesca
List of municipalities in Teruel
List of municipalities in Zaragoza

References

External links
 Comarcas of Aragon and legal links about their creation.

 Comarcal division, basic data (Aragonese Statistical Institute)